Giorgia Brenzan (born 21 August 1967) is an Italian football coach and former goalkeeper. She was part of the Italy squad at the 1991 FIFA Women's World Cup and 1999 FIFA Women's World Cup. At club level she made over 700 appearances, collecting two women's Serie A winner's medals and four Coppa Italia winner's medals.

International career
Brenzan won her first cap for the Italy women's national football team in March 1986, appearing as a 73rd-minute substitute for Eva Russo in a 2–2 friendly draw with the Netherlands in Ascoli Piceno. 

At the 1991 FIFA Women's World Cup, Brenzan was back-up to Stefania Antonini as Italy reached the quarter-final and lost 3–2 to Norway after extra time. At UEFA Women's Euro 1993 hosts Italy reached the final and suffered another defeat by Norway, 1–0 this time. By then Brenzan had recaptured her starting position from Antonini, with whom she enjoyed a friendly rivalry for the national team goalkeeper position.

References

External links
FIFA profile

1967 births
Living people
Italian women's footballers
Italy women's international footballers
1991 FIFA Women's World Cup players
1999 FIFA Women's World Cup players
Women's association football goalkeepers
Italian football managers
Female association football managers
FIFA Century Club
ACF Milan players
Torres Calcio Femminile players
C.F. Euromobil Modena players
Foroni Verona F.C. players
Footballers from Turin